The yellow-spotted snake eel (Callechelys lutea), also known as the freckled snake eel, is an eel in the family Ophichthidae (worm/snake eels). It was described by John Otterbein Snyder in 1904.

It is a marine, tropical eel which is known from the Hawaiian Islands, Midway Island, and the French Frigate Shoals, in the Pacific Ocean.

References

yellow-spotted snake eel
Fish of Hawaii
Endemic fauna of Hawaii
yellow-spotted snake eel